Band-e Bon (also Romanized as Band Bon; also known as Bandīn) is a village in Chahardangeh Rural District, Chahardangeh District, Sari County, Mazandaran Province, Iran. At the 2006 census, its population was 114, in 34 families.

References 

Populated places in Sari County